Kattowitz is the German name for the Polish city of Katowice.

Kattowitz may also refer to:

Places
 Katowice (parliamentary constituency)
 Kattowitz (region)
 Katowice Forest Park
 Katowice Voivodeship

Sports
1. FC Kattowitz, an ethnically German association football club playing in what was Kattowitz, Silesia Province in Germany (now Katowice, Silesian Voivodeship, Poland) and was active during the inter-war period and World War II when the two countries struggled over control of the region
Germania Kattowitz, an ethnically German association football club playing in what was Kattowitz, Upper Silesia in Germany (now Katowice, Poland) before the First World War and shortly afterwards
Diana Kattowitz, an ethnically German association football club playing in what was Kattowitz, Upper Silesia in Germany (now Katowice, Poland) during the inter-war period

Other
 Kattowitzer Volkswille, a newspaper in Weimar Germany

See also